Saubert is a surname. Notable people with the surname include:

Eric Saubert (born 1994), American football player
Jean Saubert (1942–2007), American alpine ski racer